Psyrana is a genus of Asian bush crickets of the tribe Holochlorini within the subfamily Phaneropterinae. They occur in Sri Lanka Indo-China, China, Korea, Japan, and Malesia to New Caledonia.

Species
Species include:

References

Phaneropterinae
Tettigoniidae genera
Insects of Asia
Orthoptera of Indo-China